Lake Michigan is one of the five Great Lakes of North America. It is the second-largest of the Great Lakes by volume and the third-largest by surface area, after Lake Superior and Lake Huron.

Lake Michigan is the only one of the five Great Lakes located fully in the United States; the other four are shared between the United States and Canada. Lake Michigan is the world's largest lake by area located fully in one country. It is shared, from west to east, by the U.S. states of Wisconsin, Illinois, Indiana, and Michigan. Ports along its shores include Chicago in Illinois, Gary in Indiana, Milwaukee and Green Bay in Wisconsin, and Muskegon in Michigan. The lake is flanked by multiple long bays, including Green Bay in the northwest, and Grand Traverse and Little Traverse bays in the northeast. The word "Michigan" is believed to come from the Ojibwe word  (michi-gami or mishigami) meaning "great water".

History 

Some of the most studied early human inhabitants of the Lake Michigan region were the Hopewell Native Americans. Their culture declined after 800 AD and for the next few hundred years, the region was the home of peoples known as the Late Woodland Native Americans. In the early 17th century, when western European explorers made their first forays into the region, they encountered descendants of the Late Woodland Native Americans: the historic Chippewa; Menominee; Sauk; Fox; Winnebago; Miami; Ottawa; and Potawatomi peoples. The French explorer Jean Nicolet is believed to have been the first European to reach Lake Michigan, possibly in 1634 or 1638. In the earliest European maps of the region, the name of Lake Illinois has been found in addition to that of "Michigan", named for the Illinois Confederation of tribes. During the 1640s and 1650s, the Beaver Wars over the fur trade with the European colonies, initiated by the Iroquois, forced a massive demographic shift as their western neighbors fled the violence. They sought refuge west and north of Lake Michigan.

Lake Michigan is joined via the narrow, open-water Straits of Mackinac with Lake Huron, and the combined body of water is sometimes called Michigan–Huron (also Huron–Michigan). The Straits of Mackinac were an important Native American and fur trade route. Located on the southern side of the straits is the town of Mackinaw City, Michigan, the site of Fort Michilimackinac, a reconstructed French fort founded in 1715, and on the northern side is St. Ignace, Michigan, site of a French Catholic mission to the Indians, founded in 1671. In 1673, Jacques Marquette, Louis Jolliet and their crew of five Métis voyageurs followed Lake Michigan to Green Bay and up the Fox River, nearly to its headwaters, in their search for the Mississippi River. By the late 18th century, the eastern end of the straits was controlled by Fort Mackinac on Mackinac Island, a British colonial and early American military base and fur trade center, founded in 1781.

With the advent of European exploration into the area in the late 17th century, Lake Michigan became used as part of a line of waterways leading from the Saint Lawrence River to the Mississippi River and thence to the Gulf of Mexico. French coureurs des bois and voyageurs established small ports and trading communities, such as Green Bay, on the lake during the late 17th and early 18th centuries. In the 19th century, Lake Michigan was integral to the development of Chicago and the Midwestern United States west of the lake. For example, 90% of the grain shipped from Chicago traveled by ships east over Lake Michigan during the antebellum years. The volume rarely fell below 50% after the Civil War even with the major expansion of railroad shipping.

The first person to reach the deep bottom of Lake Michigan was J. Val Klump, a scientist at the University of Wisconsin–Milwaukee in 1985. Klump reached the bottom via submersible as part of a research expedition. In 2007, a row of stones paralleling an ancient shoreline was discovered by Mark Holley, professor of underwater archeology at Northwestern Michigan College. One of the stones is said to have a carving resembling a mastodon. The formation needed more study before it could be authenticated. The warming of Lake Michigan was the subject of a 2018 report by Purdue University. In each decade since 1980, steady increases in obscure surface temperature have occurred. This is likely to lead to decreasing native habitat and to adversely affect native species survival, including game fish.

Hydrology 

The Milwaukee Reef, running under Lake Michigan from a point between Milwaukee and Racine to a point between Grand Haven and Muskegon, divides the lake into northern and southern basins. Each basin has a clockwise flow of water, deriving from rivers, winds, and the Coriolis effect. Prevailing westerly winds tend to move the surface water toward the east, producing a moderating effect on the climate of western Michigan. There is a mean difference in summer water temperatures of 5 to 10 degrees Fahrenheit (2 to 5 degrees Celsius) between the Wisconsin and Michigan shores.

Hydrologically Michigan and Huron are the same body of water (sometimes called Lake Michigan-Huron) but are normally considered distinct. Counted together, it is the largest body of fresh water in the world by surface area. The Mackinac Bridge is generally considered the dividing line between them. The main inflow to Lake Michigan from Lake Superior, through Lake Huron, is controlled by the locks operated by the bi-national Lake Superior Board of Control.

Statistics

Lake Michigan is the only Great Lake that is wholly within the borders of the United States; the others are shared with Canada.

It is the larger half of Lake Michigan–Huron, which is the largest body of fresh water in the world by surface area. The lake's average depth is 46 fathoms 3 feet (279 ft; 85 m), while its greatest depth is 153 fathoms 5 feet (923 ft; 281 m). It contains a volume of 1,180 cubic miles (4,918 km³) of water. Green Bay in the northwest is its largest bay. Grand Traverse Bay in its northeast is another large bay. Lake Michigan's deepest region, which lies in its northern half, is called Chippewa Basin (named after prehistoric Lake Chippewa) and is separated from South Chippewa Basin by a relatively shallower area called the Mid Lake Plateau.

Islands 

 At , Beaver Island is the largest island in Lake Michigan; it is the namesake of an archipelago in Charlevoix County, Michigan, which includes Garden Island, Grape Island, Gull Island, Hat Island, High Island, Hog Island, Horseshoe Island, Little Island, Pismire Island, Shoe Island, Ojibwa Island, Trout Island, and Whiskey Island. Fisherman's Island is also found in Charlevoix County.
 The Fox Islands in Leelanau County, Michigan, consist of North Fox Island and South Fox Island.
 The Manitou Islands in Leelanau County, Michigan, consist of North Manitou Island and South Manitou Island.
 Islands within Grand Traverse Bay include Bassett Island, Bellow Island, and Power Island.
 Islands south of the Garden Peninsula in Delta County, Michigan include Gravelly Island, Gull Island, Little Gull Island, Little Summer Island, Poverty Island, Rocky Island, St. Martin Island, and Summer Island.
 Islands in Big Bay de Noc in Delta County, Michigan include Round Island, St. Vital Island, and Snake Island.
 Islands in Little Bay de Noc in Delta County, Michigan include Butlers Island and Sand Island.
 Wilderness State Park in Emmet County, Michigan contains Temperance Island and Waugoshance Island. Ile Aux Galets is also found in Emmet County.
 Epoufette Island, Gravel Island, Little Hog Island, and Naubinway Island are located in Mackinac County, Michigan, in the area of Epoufette, Michigan and Naubinway, Michigan.
 Green Island and St. Helena Island are in the vicinity of the Mackinac Bridge, in Mackinac County, Michigan.
 Islands surrounding the Door Peninsula in Wisconsin include Chambers Island, Fish Island, Gravel Island, Spider Island, Horseshoe Island, the Sister Islands, Detroit Island, Green Island, Hog Island, Pilot Island, Plum Island, Rock Island, the Strawberry Islands and Washington Island. The northern half of the peninsula is technically an island itself, due to the Sturgeon Bay Ship Canal.
 Northerly Island is a  man-made peninsula in Chicago. It is the home of the Adler Planetarium, the former site of Meigs Field, and the current site of the temporary concert venue Huntington Bank Pavilion each summer.

Connection to other water bodies 
In the mid 20th century, construction of the Saint Lawrence Seaway and Great Lakes Waterway opened the Great Lakes to ocean-going vessels. But the wider ocean-going container ships that were developed later do not fit through the locks on these routes, which limits shipping on the lakes. Lake freighters are used on the lakes that are too large to pass the locks and enter the ocean. Despite their vast size, large sections of the Great Lakes freeze in winter, interrupting most shipping. Some icebreakers ply the lakes.

Lake Michigan is connected by the Illinois Waterway to the Gulf of Mexico via the Illinois River and the Mississippi River. Commercial tug-and-barge traffic on these waterways is heavy. Pleasure boats can enter or exit the Great Lakes by way of the Erie Canal and Hudson River in New York. The Erie Canal connects to the Great Lakes at the east end of Lake Erie (at Buffalo, New York) and at the south side of Lake Ontario (at Oswego, New York).

Water level 
The lake fluctuates from month to month with the highest lake levels typically occurring in summer. The monthly average high-water records were broken for several months in a row in 2020.

Lake levels tend to be the lowest in winter. As with the high-water records, monthly low-water records were set each month from February 1964 through January 1965. The all-time low-water mark was eclipsed in January 2013.

Keith Kompoltowicz, chief of watershed hydrology for the U.S. Army Corps of Engineers' district office in Detroit, explained that biggest factors leading to the lower water levels in 2013 were a combination of the "lack of a large snowpack" in the winter of 2011/2012 coupled with very hot and dry conditions in the summer of 2012.

Drinking water
Lake Michigan, like the other Great Lakes, supplies drinking water to millions of people in bordering areas.

The Great Lakes are collectively administered by the Conference of Great Lakes and St. Lawrence Governors and Premiers, intergovernmental organization led by the governing chief executives of the Canadian provinces of Ontario and Québec, and by the governors of the U.S. states of Illinois, Indiana, Michigan, Minnesota, New York, Ohio, Pennsylvania, and Wisconsin. The Conference came into force, in December 2008, with the enactment of laws in all of the states and the two provinces, and the enactment of a United States federal law.

Environmental problems can still plague the lake. Steel mills and refineries operate near the Indiana shoreline. The Chicago Tribune reported that BP is a major polluter, dumping thousands of pounds of raw sludge into the lake every day from its Whiting, Indiana, oil refinery.

Shoreline

Beaches 

Lake Michigan has many beaches. The region is often referred to as the "Third Coast" of the United States, after those of the Atlantic Ocean and the Pacific Ocean. The sand is often soft and off-white, known as "singing sands" because of the squeaking noise (caused by high quartz content) it emits when walked upon. However, because prevailing westerly winds tend to move the surface water toward the east, there is a flow of warmer water to the Michigan shore in the summer.

The sand dunes located on the east shore of Lake Michigan are the largest freshwater dune system in the world. In multiple locations along the shoreline, the dunes rise several hundred feet above the lake surface. Large dune formations can be seen in many state parks, national forests and national parks along the Indiana and Michigan shoreline. Some of the most expansive and unique dune formations can be found at Indiana Dunes National Park, Saugatuck Dunes State Park, Warren Dunes State Park, Hoffmaster State Park, Silver Lake State Park, Ludington State Park, and Sleeping Bear Dunes National Lakeshore. Small dune formations can be found on the western shore of Lake Michigan at Illinois Beach State Park, and moderate-sized dune formations can be found in Kohler-Andrae State Park and Point Beach State Forest in Wisconsin. A large dune formation can be found in Whitefish Dunes State Park in Wisconsin in the Door Peninsula. Lake Michigan beaches in Northern Michigan are the only place in the world, aside from a few inland lakes in that region, where Petoskey stones, the Michigan state stone, can be found.

The beaches of the western coast and the northernmost part of the east coast are often rocky, with some sandy beaches. The southern and eastern beaches are typically sandy and dune-covered. This is partly because of the prevailing winds from the west (which also cause thick layers of ice to build on the eastern shore in winter). The Chicago city waterfront has been developed for parks, beaches, harbors and marinas, and residential developments connected by the Chicago Lakefront Trail. Where there are no beaches or marinas, stone or concrete revetments protect the shoreline from erosion.

Cities 

Twelve million people live along Lake Michigan's shores, mainly in the Chicago and Milwaukee metropolitan areas. The economy of many communities in northern Michigan and Door County, Wisconsin, is supported by tourism, with large seasonal populations attracted by Lake Michigan. Many seasonal residents have summer homes along the waterfront and return to other homes for the winter. The southern tip of the lake near Gary, Indiana, is heavily industrialized.

Cities on the shores of Lake Michigan include:

	
Illinois
 Chicago
 Evanston
 Wilmette
 Winnetka
 Kenilworth
 Glencoe
 Highland Park
 Lake Forest
 Lake Bluff
 Naval Station Great Lakes
 North Chicago
 Waukegan
 Beach Park
 Zion
 Winthrop Harbor

Indiana
 East Chicago
 Gary
 Hammond
 Michigan City
 Portage
 Porter
 Whiting

Michigan

 Benton Harbor
 Bridgman
 Charlevoix
 Douglas
 Elberta
 Escanaba
 Ferrysburg
 Frankfort
 Gladstone
 Glenn
 Grand Beach
 Grand Haven
 Harbor Springs
 Ludington

 Manistee
 Manistique
 Menominee
 Michiana
 Muskegon
 New Buffalo
 Norton Shores
 Pentwater
 Petoskey
 Saugatuck
 St. Joseph
 Shoreham
 South Haven
 Traverse City

Wisconsin

 Algoma
 Bay View
 Cudahy
 Fox Point
 Green Bay
 Kenosha
 Kewaunee
 Manitowoc
Marinette
 Milwaukee
 Mequon

 Oconto
 Port Washington
 Racine
 Saint Francis
 Sheboygan
 Shorewood
 South Milwaukee
 Sturgeon Bay
 Two Rivers
 Whitefish Bay
 Waterford

Parks 
The National Park Service maintains the Sleeping Bear Dunes National Lakeshore and Indiana Dunes National Park. Parts of the shoreline are within the Hiawatha National Forest and the Manistee National Forest. The Manistee National Forest section of the shoreline includes the Nordhouse Dunes Wilderness. The Lake Michigan division of the Michigan Islands National Wildlife Refuge is also within the lake, as is the Green Bay National Wildlife Refuge.

There are numerous state and local parks located on the shores of the lake or on islands within the lake:

 Chicago Park District Beaches
 Duck Lake State Park
 Fayette Historic State Park
 Fisherman's Island State Park
 Grand Haven State Park
 Grand Mere State Park
 Harrington Beach State Park
 Holland State Park
 Hoffmaster State Park
 Illinois Beach State Park
 Indian Lake State Park
 Indiana Dunes State Park
 Kohler-Andrae State Park
 Lake Park, Milwaukee
 Ludington State Park
 Leelanau State Park
 Mears State Park
 Muskegon State Park
 Newport State Park
 Orchard Beach State Park
 Peninsula State Park
 Pere Marquette Beach
 Potawatomi State Park
 Racine Zoo
 Rock Island State Park
 Saugatuck Dunes State Park
 Shingleton Management Unit within the Lake Superior State Forest
 Silver Lake State Park
 Traverse City State Park
 Terry Andrae State Park
 Van Buren State Park
 Warren Dunes State Park
 Wells State Park
 Whitefish Dunes State Park
 Wilderness State Park

Human activities

Fishing 
Lake Michigan is home to a small variety of fish species and other organisms. It was originally home to lake whitefish, lake trout, yellow perch, panfish, largemouth bass, smallmouth bass and bowfin, as well as some species of catfish. As a result of improvements to the Welland Canal in 1918, an invasion of sea lampreys and overharvesting, there has been a decline in native lake trout populations, ultimately causing an increase in the population of another invasive species, the alewife. As a result, salmonids, including various strains of brown trout, steelhead (rainbow trout), coho and chinook salmon, were introduced as predators in order to decrease the wildlife population. This program was so successful that the introduced population of trout and salmon exploded, resulting in the creation of a large sport fishery for these introduced species. Lake Michigan is now stocked annually with steelhead, brown trout, and coho and chinook salmon, which have also begun natural reproduction in some Lake Michigan tributaries. However, several introduced invasive species, such as lampreys, round goby, zebra mussels and quagga mussels, continue to cause major changes in water clarity and fertility, resulting in knock-on changes to Lake Michigan's ecosystem, threatening the vitality of native fish populations.

Fisheries in inland waters of the United States are small compared to marine fisheries. The largest fisheries are the landings from the Great Lakes, worth about $14 million in 2001. Michigan's commercial fishery today consists mainly of 150 tribe-licensed commercial fishing operations through the Chippewa-Ottawa Resource Authority and tribes belonging to the Great Lakes Indian Fish and Wildlife Commission, which harvest 50 percent of the Great Lakes commercial catch in Michigan waters, and 45 state-licensed commercial fishing enterprises. The prime commercial species is the lake whitefish. The price for lake whitefish dropped from $1.04/lb. to as low as $0.40/lb during periods of high production.

Sports fishing includes salmon, whitefish, smelt, lake trout and walleye as major catches. In the late 1960s, successful stocking programs for Pacific salmon led to the development of Lake Michigan's charter fishing industry.

Shipping 
Like all of the Great Lakes, Lake Michigan is today used as a major mode of transport for bulk goods. In 2002, 162 million net tons of dry bulk cargo were moved via the Lakes. This was, in order of volume: iron ore, grain and potash. The iron ore and much of the stone and coal are used in the steel industry. There is also some shipping of liquid and containerized cargo, but most container vessels cannot pass the locks on the Saint Lawrence Seaway because the ships are too wide. The total amount of shipping on the lakes has been on a downward trend for several years. The Port of Chicago, operated by the Illinois International Port District, has grain (14 million bushels) and bulk liquid (800,000 barrels) storage facilities along Lake Calumet. The central element of the Port District, Calumet Harbor, is maintained by the U.S. Army Corps of Engineers.

Ferries 

Two passenger and vehicle ferries operate ferry services across Lake Michigan, both connecting Wisconsin on the western shore with Michigan on the east. From May to October, the historic steamship, operates daily between Manitowoc, Wisconsin, and Ludington, Michigan, connecting U.S. Highway 10 between the two cities. The Lake Express, established in 2004, carries passengers and vehicles across the lake between Milwaukee, Wisconsin, and Muskegon, Michigan.

Tourism and recreation 
Tourism and recreation are major industries on all of the Great Lakes. A few small cruise ships operate on Lake Michigan, including a couple of sailing ships. Many other water sports are practiced on the lakes, such as yachting, sea kayaking, diving, kitesurfing and lake surfing. Great Lakes passenger steamers have been operating since the mid-19th century. Several ferries currently operate on the Great Lakes to carry passengers to various islands, including Beaver Island and Bois Blanc Island (Michigan). Currently, two car ferry services traverse Lake Michigan from around April to November: the SS Badger, a steamer from Ludington, Michigan, to Manitowoc, Wisconsin, and the Lake Express, a high speed catamaran from Milwaukee to Muskegon, Michigan.

The Great Lakes Circle Tour, a designated scenic road system, connects all of the Great Lakes and the St. Lawrence River. The lake is a great place to view ice volcanoes, which typically occur at the start of the winter season.

See also 

 Jardine Water Purification Plant
 Lake Michigan Shore AVA
 List of lighthouses in the United States
 Leelanau Peninsula
 Little Traverse Bay
 Port of Milwaukee

References

Further reading

External links 

 
 EPA's Great Lakes Atlas
 Great Lakes Coast Watch
 Michigan DNR map of Lake Michigan
 Official Michigan DNR Freshwater Fishing Regulations 
 Bathymetry of Lake Michigan

Lighthouses
 Bibliography on Michigan lighthouses
 Interactive map of lighthouses in area (northern Lake Michigan)
 Interactive map of lighthouses in area (southern Lake Michigan)
 Terry Pepper on lighthouses of the western Great Lakes
 Wagner, John L., Beacons Shining in the Night , Michigan lighthouse bibliography, chronology, history, and photographs, Clarke Historical Library, Central Michigan University

 
Michigan
Michigan
Michigan
West Michigan
Northern Michigan
Michigan
Borders of Wisconsin
Borders of Michigan
Borders of Indiana
Borders of Illinois
Michigan
Michigan
Michigan
Michigan
Michigan
Michigan
Michigan
Michigan
Michigan
Michigan
Michigan
Michigan
Michigan
Michigan
Michigan
Michigan
Michigan
Michigan
Michigan